On 3 August 1979, a Constitutional Convention election was held in Khuzestan Province constituency with plurality-at-large voting format in order to decide four seats for the Assembly for the Final Review of the Constitution.

The Islamic Republican Party was able to secure three of the seats (two of whom endorsed by the Movement of Militant Muslims), while the fourth winner was only supported by the Movement of Militant Muslims. They were followed by the defeated candidate who was endorsed by both the Combatant Clergy Association and the Freedom Movement of Iran in fifth place. Several communists who belonged to groups advocating different lines (Maoism, Trotskyism and pro-Soviet) also contested in the election but were all defeated by a wide margin. The two candidates of the right-wing Nation Party of Iran received less than 1% of the votes.

Results 

 
 
 
 
|-
|colspan="14" style="background:#E9E9E9;"|
|-
 

 
 
 
 
 
 
 
 
 
 
 
 
 
 

|-
|colspan=14|
|-
|colspan=14|Source:

References

1979 elections in Iran
Khuzestan Province